Carebara is a genus of ants in the subfamily Myrmicinae. It is one of the largest myrmicine genera with more than 200 species distributed worldwide in the tropics and the Afrotropical region. Many of them are very tiny cryptic soil and leaf litter inhabitants. They nest in rotten wood to which the bark is still adherent in the Afrotropical region, or may be lestobiotic nesting near other ant species. Some species are known to exist parasitically within termite nests. Little is known about the biology of the species. However, they are notable for the vast difference in size between queens and workers.

Species

Carebara aborensis (Wheeler, 1913)
Carebara abuhurayri Sharaf & Aldawood, 2011
Carebara acuta (Weber, 1952)
Carebara acutispina (Xu, 2003)
Carebara affinis (Jerdon, 1851)
Carebara afghana (Pisarski, 1970)
Carebara africana (Forel, 1910)
Carebara alluaudi (Santschi, 1913)
Carebara alperti Fernández, 2010
Carebara alpha (Forel, 1905)
Carebara altinoda (Xu, 2003)
Carebara amia (Forel, 1913)
Carebara ampla Santschi, 1912
Carebara angolensis (Santschi, 1914)
Carebara angulata Fernández, 2004
Carebara anophthalma (Emery, 1906)
†Carebara antiqua (Mayr, 1868)
Carebara arabara Fernández, 2010
Carebara arabica (Collingwood & Van Harten, 2001)
Carebara armata (Donisthorpe, 1948)
Carebara arnoldi (Forel, 1913)
Carebara arnoldiella (Santschi, 1919)
Carebara asina (Forel, 1902)
Carebara atoma (Emery, 1900)
Carebara audita Fernández, 2004
Carebara bartrumi Weber, 1943
Carebara bengalensis (Forel, 1902)
Carebara beta (Forel, 1905)
Carebara bicarinata Santschi, 1912
Carebara bihornata (Xu, 2003)
†Carebara bohemica (Novák, 1877)
Carebara borealis (Terayama, 1996)
Carebara bouvardi (Santschi, 1913)
Carebara brasiliana Fernández, 2004
Carebara brevipilosa Fernández, 2004
Carebara bruchi (Santschi, 1933)
Carebara bruni (Forel, 1913)
Carebara butteli (Forel, 1913)
Carebara capreola (Wheeler, 1927)
Carebara carinata Bharti & Kumar, 2013
Carebara castanea Smith, 1858
Carebara coeca Fernández, 2004
Carebara concinna (Mayr, 1867)
Carebara convexa (Weber, 1950)
Carebara coqueta Fernández, 2006
Carebara cornigera (Forel, 1902)
Carebara crassiuscula (Emery, 1900)
Carebara cribriceps (Wheeler, 1927)
Carebara crigensis (Belshaw & Bolton, 1994)
Carebara curvispina (Xu, 2003)
Carebara debilis (Santschi, 1913)
Carebara dentata Bharti & Kumar, 2013
Carebara deponens (Walker, 1859)
Carebara diabola (Santschi, 1913)
Carebara diabolica (Baroni Urbani, 1969)
Carebara distincta (Bolton & Belshaw, 1993)
Carebara diversa (Jerdon, 1851)
Carebara donisthorpei (Weber, 1950)
Carebara elmenteitae (Patrizi, 1948)
Carebara elongata Fernández, 2004
Carebara erythraea (Emery, 1915)
Carebara escherichi (Forel, 1911)
Carebara fayrouzae Sharaf, 2013
Carebara frontalis (Weber, 1950)
Carebara globularia Fernández, 2004
Carebara grandidieri (Forel, 1891)
Carebara guineana Fernández, 2006
Carebara hannya (Terayama, 1996)
Carebara hornata Bharti & Kumar, 2013
Carebara hunanensis (Wu & Wang, 1995)
Carebara inca Fernández, 2004
Carebara incerta (Santschi, 1919)
Carebara incierta Fernández, 2004
Carebara infima (Santschi, 1913)
Carebara intermedia Fernández, 2004
Carebara jacobsoni (Forel, 1911)
Carebara jeanneli (Santschi, 1913)
Carebara jiangxiensis (Wu & Wang, 1995)
Carebara junodi Forel, 1904
Carebara khamiensis (Arnold, 1952)
Carebara kofana Fernández, 2004
Carebara lamellifrons (Forel, 1902)
Carebara langi Wheeler, 1922
Carebara latro (Santschi, 1937)
Carebara leei (Forel, 1902)
Carebara lignata Westwood, 1840
Carebara longiceps (Santschi, 1929)
Carebara longii (Wheeler, 1903)
Carebara lucida (Santschi, 1917)
Carebara lusciosa (Wheeler, 1928)
Carebara majeri Fernández, 2004
Carebara manni (Donisthorpe, 1941)
Carebara mayri (Forel, 1901)
Carebara menozzii (Ettershank, 1966)
Carebara minima (Emery, 1900)
Carebara minuta Fernández, 2004
Carebara mjobergi (Forel, 1915)
Carebara nana (Santschi, 1919)
Carebara nayana (Sheela & Narendran, 1997)
†Carebara nitida (Dlussky & Perkovsky, 2002)
Carebara norfolkensis (Donisthorpe, 1941)
Carebara nosindambo (Forel, 1891)
Carebara nuda Fernández, 2004
Carebara obtusidenta (Xu, 2003)
Carebara octata (Bolton & Belshaw, 1993)
Carebara oertzeni (Forel, 1886)
Carebara oni (Terayama, 1996)
Carebara osborni Wheeler, 1922
Carebara overbecki (Viehmeyer, 1916)
Carebara paeta (Santschi, 1937)
Carebara panamensis (Wheeler, 1925)
Carebara patrizii Menozzi, 1927
Carebara paya Fernández, 2004
Carebara perpusilla (Emery, 1895)
Carebara peruviana (Emery, 1906)
Carebara petulca (Wheeler, 1922)
Carebara pilosa Fernández, 2004
Carebara pisinna (Bolton & Belshaw, 1993)
Carebara polita (Santschi, 1914)
Carebara polyphemus (Wheeler, 1928)
Carebara propomegata Bharti & Kumar, 2013
Carebara pseudolusciosa (Wu & Wang, 1995)
Carebara punctata (Karavaiev, 1931)
Carebara qianliyan Terayama, 2009
Carebara raja (Forel, 1902)
Carebara rara (Bolton & Belshaw, 1993)
Carebara rectangulata Bharti & Kumar, 2013
Carebara rectidorsa (Xu, 2003)
Carebara reina Fernández, 2004
Carebara reticapita (Xu, 2003)
Carebara reticulata Fernández, 2004
Carebara robertsoni (Bolton & Belshaw, 1993)
Carebara rothneyi (Forel, 1902)
Carebara rugata (Forel, 1913)
Carebara sakamotoi Terayama, Lin & Eguchi, 2012
Carebara sangi (Eguchi & Bui, 2007)
Carebara santschii (Weber, 1943)
Carebara sarasinorum (Emery, 1901)
Carebara sarita (Bolton & Belshaw, 1993)
Carebara satana (Karavaiev, 1935)
Carebara sauteri (Forel, 1912)
Carebara semilaevis (Mayr, 1901)
Carebara sicheli Mayr, 1862
Carebara silvestrii (Santschi, 1914)
Carebara simalurensis (Forel, 1915)
Carebara similis (Mayr, 1862)
Carebara sinhala Fischer, Azorsa & Fisher, 2014
Carebara sodalis (Emery, 1914)
†Carebara sophiae (Emery, 1891)
Carebara spinata Bharti & Kumar, 2013
Carebara stenoptera (Kusnezov, 1952)
Carebara striata (Xu, 2003)
Carebara sublatro (Forel, 1913)
Carebara subreptor (Emery, 1900)
Carebara sudanensis (Weber, 1943)
Carebara sudanica Santschi, 1933
Carebara sundaica (Forel, 1913)
Carebara tahitiensis (Wheeler, 1936)
Carebara taiponica (Wheeler, 1928)
Carebara taprobanae (Forel, 1911)
Carebara tenua Fernández, 2004
Carebara termitolestes (Wheeler, 1918)
Carebara thoracica (Weber, 1950)
†Carebara thorali (Théobald, 1937)
Carebara traegaordhi (Santschi, 1914)
†Carebara ucrainica (Dlussky & Perkovsky, 2002)
Carebara ugandana (Santschi, 1923)
Carebara urichi (Wheeler, 1922)
Carebara vidua Smith, 1858
Carebara viehmeyeri (Mann, 1919)
Carebara villiersi (Bernard, 1953)
Carebara voeltzkowi (Forel, 1907)
Carebara vorax (Santschi, 1914)
Carebara weyeri (Karavaiev, 1930)
Carebara wheeleri (Ettershank, 1966)
Carebara wroughtonii (Forel, 1902)
Carebara yamatonis (Terayama, 1996)

References

External links

Myrmicinae
Ant genera